The Ecologist Greens (OP) are a Greek green political party. They are a member of the European Green Party.

History
The Ecological Forum, the body that lead to the establishment of the party, was founded after a proposal of the local group Ecological Movement of Thessaloniki (http://ecology-salonika.org/2010/), and brought together the political party "Green Politics" (Prasini Politiki), the previous Greek member of the European Green Party, with other local ecological groups and independent ecologists.

On 7–8 December 2002, the Ecological Forum called for a conference that convened in the building of the Athens Lawyer Association, and it decided to establish the Ecologists Greens and elected an 18-member council to coordinate the establishment of a new political entity. In the coming months, focus groups were created to shape the constitution and the political positions of the body, which were adopted by the first congress of the party in May 2003 at Panteion University.

2004 European Elections
The 2004 Ecologists Greens participated for the first time in elections 2004 European Elections with Michalis Tremopoulos in the top of the list and they received 0.67%.

2006 Local Elections
In the prefectural elections of 2006, the Ecologists Greens supported the "Ecology -Solidarity" in Thessaloniki, that won 4.6% and acquired 2 seats on the Prefecture Council of Thessaloniki (Tremopoulos Michalis and Gogakou Dimitra), the "Eco-Athens" in the municipality of Athens, that took 1.4% of the votes, as well as 53 other municipal and County sets in rest of the country.

2007 National elections
At its 5th Congress in March 2007, the party decided to contest the 2007 Greek legislative election. Nanos Valaoritis, a distinguished living Greek poet, became the party's leading candidate in the 2007 Greek legislative election.

2008 Congress
During 29 & 30 of March 2008 the annual congress of the party took place in Athens at the Gini building of the National Technical University of Athens (NTUA). The annual congress is the highest political entity of the party and was attended by a record of 235 members. Members of the party are recently (September 2008) reaching 700. With the 2007 Greek legislative election, its first general election, the party became the sixth largest party in Greece and the largest party without parliamentary representation.

2009 European and National elections
In the December 6-7-8 Party General Assembly it was decided to contest the 2009 European Elections and the list of party candidates was elected. The Ecologists Greens managed to elect Michalis Tremopoulos as MEP, but they narrowly failed to gain representation in the following national elections in October 2009. Nevertheless, their share of the vote increased to 2.53% gaining approximately 100,000 more votes than in 2007.

January 2015 National elections
In January 2015, the Ecologists Greens decided to collaborate with SYRIZA. Alexis Tsipras' called for unity against the Memorandum and the Ecologists Greens decided to support SYRIZA's electoral list for the upcoming legislative election. One Ecologist Green MP was elected on the SYRIZA ticket, Giorgos Dimaras, and an Ecologist Green, Giannis Tsironis, was appointed Alternate Minister of Environment and Energy in the first Tsipras Cabinet.

September 2015 National elections
Giorgos Dimaras was reelected and Giannis Tsironis was elected for the first time. Tsironis was reappointed Alternate Minister of Environment in the second Tsipras cabinet on 23 September 2015.

On the September 2018 cabinet reshuffle, Giorgos Dimaras was appointed Vice Minister of Environment.

Aims
The basic principles of the Ecologists Greens, as determined by their constitution are: sustainability, social justice, nonviolence, direct and participatory democracy, respect for diversity, decentralization and subsidiarity, protect and restore natural ecosystems, the quality of life, personal & social responsibility, equity and anti-austerity.

Electoral results

Affiliations
European Green Party

References

External links 
 Official web site
 European Green Party profile of the party

Green political parties in Greece
European Green Party
2002 in Greek politics
2002 establishments in Greece
Political parties established in 2002
Global Greens member parties